The university is Entitled by University Grants Commission to offer higher studies degree courses online.

Campus

Awards

The National Assessment and Accreditation Council accredited the university at the five-star level. Later, it was accredited at NAAC Grade "A" with a CGPA of 3.5. Most recently, it has been accredited with NAAC CGPA 3.51, enshrined with the esteemed "University with Potential for Excellence" and "Category - 1 Autonomy" Status by UGC and MHRD respectively.

Ranking 

Guru Nanak Dev University was ranked 44th among universities in India by the National Institutional Ranking Framework (NIRF) in 2022 and 80th overall.

Vice Chancellors
Bishan Singh Samundri (1969 to 1978)
Karam Singh Gill (1978 to 1981)
J. S. Grewal (1981 to 1984)
S. S. Bal (1985 to 1988)
Gurdip Singh Randhawa (1989 to 1996)
Harbhajan Singh Soch (1996 to 2001)
S. P. Singh (2001 to 2006)
Ajaib Singh Brar (2009 to 2017)
Jaspal Singh Sandhu (2017–Present)

Significant Achievements of University
The university has also earned “Category One” status. MHRD, Government of India has recognized the university as one of the country's top ten “High Performing State Public Universities” and has funded it under Rashtriya Uchhtar Siksha Abhiyan (RUSA). It is ranked 53rd amongst all universities and institutions in the country by the National Institutional Ranking Framework (NIRF). In World Universities Ranking (CWUR) the university is placed amongst top 9% of the universities of the world. The Government of India recognizing its contribution has established the Centre for Interfaith Studies and MYAS-GNDU Department of Sports Sciences and Medicine.

The university has made a mark in Sports having won the Maulana Abul Kalam Azad Trophy for a record twenty-three times which is based on performance in sports in the university system. Under the “Khelo India” scheme of Govt. of India the university has been allotted two Academies in Fencing and Archery and two Centres of Excellence in Handball and Hockey. The university is known for its state-of-the-art gymnasium, indoor multipurpose hall, Olympic size swimming pool, and Astroturf among other sports facilities. The sportspersons are supported in attaining excellence by the MYAS-GNDU Department of Sports Sciences and Medicine.

More than twenty departments of the university have received varied grants under UGC-SAP, DST-FIST, and PURSE, in addition to the individual grants received by the faculty. Significant to mention here that the H-Index of the university stands amongst the top universities of this region at 112.

As a major initiative towards a green environment, the university has installed Rooftop Solar Energy Plant under the Government of India's Jawaharlal Nehru National Solar Mission (JNNSM). The university is a zero-waste discharge institution. It has an in-house wastewater treatment plant (ETP), Rooftop water harvesting & underground water charging units. GNDU is now a Limited Vehicle University, with this, entry of four-wheelers has been banned on the campus. E-buses have been provided for hop-on hop-off facilities free of charge for the students. International Students are joining the university under the “Study in India” program. 
For student-centric initiatives, an Amphi Theatre named 'Golden Expressions' has been constructed to provide a platform for all the students to express themselves with an open mic. Open Gyms have been installed on campus for fitness. The students themselves are running the social and cultural activities clubs like Dance Club, Drama Club, Photography Club, Food & Fitness club, Nature and wildlife club, Literary club, Social Service club, Music club, Science club, Movie Making club, Fine Arts club, Go Green club and GNDU Talkies.

Gallery

Notable alumni 

Some of the notable alumni include:
 Ajit Pal Singh, Indian Hockey Olympian and both Padmashri and Arjuna Awardee
 Atul Nanda, Advocate General for the State of Punjab
 Prof. Bhura Singh Ghuman, Former Vice Chancellor, Punjabi University, Patiala
 S. Dilbagh Singh, IPS, Director General of Police, Jammu and Kashmir
 Justice Fatehdeep Singh Sandhu, Hon’ble Judge, Punjab & Haryana High Court, Chandigarh
 S. Gurbachan Singh Jagat, IPS (Retd.), Former Governor of the State of Manipur (currently Trustee of The Tribune, Chandigarh)
 S. Gurtej Singh Sandhu, Vice President, Advanced Technology Developments Micron Technology, USA
 Brig. Harcharan Singh (Retd.), Indian Hockey Olympian and both VSM and Arjuna Awardee
 Dr. Harinder Pal Singh, Director, Fortis Escorts Hospital and Research Centre, Amritsar
 S. Kartar Singh Pehlvaan, IPS (Retd.), Former Inspector General of Police, Punjab and Indian Wrestling Player and both Padmashri and Arjuna Awardee
 S. Manmohan Singh, IPS, Director General of Police and Winner of Sahitya Akademi Award
 Mr. Navdeep Singh Suri, IFS (Retd.), Former Ambassador to Egypt and UAE and High commissioner to Australia
 Smt. Rajbir Kaur, Indian Women Hockey Player and Arjuna Awardee
 Prof. R. K. Kohli, Former Vice Chancellor, Central University of Punjab and Former Vice Chancellor, D.A.V. University, Jalandhar (currently Vice Chancellor, Amity University, Mohali)
 S. Sarabjit Singh, IPS (Retd.), Former Director General of Police, Punjab
 Sh. Satish Kumar Sharma, IPS (Retd.), Former Director General of Police, Punjab
 Dr. Sukhbir Singh Sandhu, IAS, chairman, National Highways Authority of India, Government of India
 Dr. Suman Sharma, International Basketball player and First Vice Chairman of the Indian Basketball Players Association and Arjuna Awardee
 Surjit Pattar, Punjabi Writer and Poet (currently President of Punjab Arts Council, Chandigarh and Padmashri Awardee)
 S. Swarajbir Singh, IPS (Retd.), Former Director General of Police, Meghalaya (currently Editor Punjabi Tribune)
 Rear Admiral Yogesh Sharma (Retd.), Western Naval Command, Mumbai
 Satinder Satti, anchor and actress
 Amrinder Gill, singer and actor
 Ranjit Bawa, singer and actor
 Sugandha Mishra, singer and actress
 Gurpreet Ghuggi, comedian and actor
Sanjeev Kumar Yadav, Deputy Commissioner of Police

See also

 Indian Institute of Management, Amritsar
 List of places named after Guru Nanak Dev

References

External links

 Official University website
NAAC Certificate

 
Universities in Punjab, India
Educational institutions established in 1969
Education in Amritsar
1969 establishments in Punjab, India
Memorials to Guru Nanak
Recipients of the Maulana Abul Kalam Azad Trophy